The Southern African Development Community intervention in Lesotho, codenamed Operation Boleas, also called the South African Invasion of Lesotho, was a military invasion launched by the Southern African Development Community (SADC), and led by South Africa through its South African National Defence Force into Lesotho to quell a coup d'état.

Prelude
In May 1998, parliamentary elections in Lesotho resulted in an overwhelming majority for the ruling Lesotho Congress for Democracy Party, which won 79 out of 80 seats. However allegations of vote fraud soon surfaced, and after a failed lawsuit by the opposition parties, widespread rioting broke out.

Under President Nelson Mandela the ANC-led government in South Africa (which completely landlocks Lesotho) announced it would hold a formal inquiry to determine the allegations of corruption. Controversially, the report only alleged minor irregularities.

Intervention
At the time of the intervention, both Mandela and Deputy President Shaun Matuwane were out of South Africa, with Home Affairs Minister Mangosuthu Buthelezi serving as acting president. Mandela approved the deployment of the South African National Defence Force (SANDF) to Lesotho on 22 September 1998 to quell the rioting and maintain order. Botswana Defence Force soldiers were also deployed. The operation was described as an "intervention to restore democracy and the rule of law". The SANDF contingent included a squadron of Ratel-90 and Rooikat armoured fighting vehicles seconded from 1 Special Service Battalion.

Widespread arson, violence, and looting occurred despite the presence of SANDF soldiers. The last South African troops were pulled out in May 1999 after seven months of occupation. The capital city of Maseru was heavily damaged, requiring a period of several years for rebuilding.

Aftermath
South Africa was accused in some quarters of using its military and diplomatic superiority as a regional hegemon to dominate and meddle in the internal affairs of its much smaller, weaker enclave in order to further its own strategic interests, in particular the water supply to its economic hub, Gauteng Province. South Africa is the largest economic and military power in the SADC.

See also
Politics of Lesotho

References

External links
"Military Intervention in Lesotho: Perspectives on Operation Boleas and Beyond", OJPCR: The Online Journal of Peace and Conflict Resolution May 1999.

History of Lesotho
Lesotho
Wars involving Botswana
Invasions by South Africa
Lesotho–South Africa relations
1998 in Lesotho
1999 in Lesotho
Lesotho